Sarah Gristwood is an English journalist and author. She was born in Kent, grew up in Dover and educated at St Anne's College, Oxford.

As a journalist she has written for a number of British papers, including The Times, The Guardian and the Telegraph. She has written historical biographies as well as fiction, and has contributed to television documentaries.

Gristwood's historical biography, Arbella: England's Lost Queen is about Lady Arbella Stuart, an English noblewoman who was considered a possible successor to Elizabeth I. In a review in The Times, Kevin Sharpe wrote, "Sarah Gristwood presents a powerful story of the dynastic insecurity of the Tudors and Stuarts, and of the vulnerability of Elizabeth and James to foreign and domestic intrigues." Sarah Gristwood accepted the invitation of the Royal Stuart Society, on the occasion of the Quatercentenary of the death of Arbella, to give a Lecture with the title: Lady Arbella Stuart – England’s Lost Queen?

Her book, Game of Queens: The Women Who Made Sixteenth-Century Europe, focuses on five queens: Catherine de Medici, Anne Boleyn, Mary I of England, Elizabeth I, and Mary, Queen of Scots.

She has appeared in the movie Venice/Venice (1992), and as herself in the television series Stars of the Silver Screen (2011) and Discovering Fashion: The Designers (2015).

Gristwood has been married to the film critic Derek Malcolm since 1994.

Bibliography
 Perdita: Royal Mistress, Writer, Romantic (2005). Bantam. 
 Arbella: England's Lost Queen (2005). Houghton Mifflin. 
 Bird of Paradise: The Colourful Career of the First Mrs Robinson (2007). Bantam. 
 Elizabeth and Leicester: The Truth about the Virgin Queen and the Man She Loved (2008). Penguin Books.  
 The Ring and the Crown: A History of Royal Weddings (2011). Hutchinson. 
 Breakfast at Tiffany's Companion: The Official 50th Anniversary Companion (2011). Rizzoli International Publications. 
 The Girl in the Mirror (2012). William Collins. 
 Blood Sisters: The Women Behind the Wars of the Roses (2012). Harper Press. 
 Fabulous Frocks (2013). Pavilion. 
 Game of Queens: The Women Who Made Sixteenth-Century Europe (2016).  Basic Books. 
 The Story of Beatrix Potter (2016) United Kingdom: Pavilion Books. 
 Elizabeth: Queen and Crown (2017). Pavilion. 
 The Queen's Mary: In the Shadows of Power... (2018). Sharpe Books.
 Vita & Virginia: The Lives and Love of Virginia Woolf and Vita Sackville-West (2018). National Trust. 
 The Tudors in Love: The Courtly Code Behind the Last Medieval Dynasty (2021). Oneworld Publications.

References

External links
 
  Sarah Gristwood website
 

Year of birth missing (living people)
Living people
Women historians
People from Dover, Kent
Alumni of St Anne's College, Oxford